Carlos Martínez Baena (7 May 1889 – 29 May 1971) was a Spanish-Mexican actor. At a young age he moved to Mexico with his family where he became a journalist. He appeared in more than seventy films from 1931 to 1970.

Selected filmography

References

External links 

1889 births
1971 deaths
Spanish male film actors
Spanish emigrants to Mexico